Pomasia euryopis is a moth in the family Geometridae. It is found on Borneo and Peninsular Malaysia.

The ground colour is pale soft yellow with red markings. There is strong sexual dimorphism in the forewing shape.

References

Moths described in 1897
Eupitheciini